Brickellia amplexicaulis, the earleaf brickellbush, is a North American species of flowering plants in the family Asteraceae. It is native to northwestern and north-central Mexico (Sonora, Sinaloa, Chihuahua) and also to the southwestern United States (Arizona and southwestern New Mexico (Hidalgo County)).

Brickellia amplexicaulis is a branching shrub up to 200 cm (80 inches) tall. Its leaves partially surround the stems. The plant produces many small flower heads with yellow or cream-colored disc florets but no ray florets.

References

amplexicaulis
Flora of the Southwestern United States
Flora of Mexico
Plants described in 1884